was a town located in Ōchi District, Shimane Prefecture, Japan.

As of 2003, the town had an estimated population of 4,335 and a density of 23.32 persons per km2. The total area was 185.89 km2.

On October 1, 2004, Ōchi, along with the village of Daiwa (also from Ōchi District), was merged to create the town of Misato.

Rivers and mountains
Gōnokawa River

References

Dissolved municipalities of Shimane Prefecture